The Norwegian police troops in Sweden during World War II consisted of around 15,000 men, recruited from Norwegian refugees and trained at a number of secret camps in Sweden.

Background

During the occupation of Norway by Nazi Germany many Norwegians fled to neutral and unoccupied Sweden to escape the occupiers. Nearly 50,000 registered refugees arrived in Sweden during the war years. In 1942 head of the Swedish National Laboratory of Forensic Science, Harry Söderman, made a visit to London, where he met the exiled Norwegian Minister of Justice Terje Wold. Wold asked Söderman about the possibilities for training Norwegian policemen in Sweden. Söderman himself was positive, but due to  Sweden's neutrality policy such a task was not possible in 1942. In February 1943, when the number of Norwegian refugees had steadily increased, there was a contact between Söderman and Olav Svendsen, head of the legal office at the Norwegian legation in Stockholm, and the two then agreed on a plan to start a course for training fifty Norwegian policemen. These policemen were to support the expected legal investigations needed after the war. Svendsen was responsible for getting funding from the Norwegian exile government in London, while Söderman received approval from the Swedish Minister of Social Affairs Gustav Möller.

Training
The first course for 20 policemen started in Stockholm 1 July 1943, and further courses were held over time. The goal was to train policemen who could participate in the legal purge in Norway after the war. Another course was held at the manor Johannesberg, north of Stockholm, for training uniformed police. Around 1,500 men were trained here, and their education included use of weapons and military training. Among the driving forces in the planning phase were, in addition to Söderman, surgeon Carl Semb, who had organized "health camps" where the refugees were classified, and Ole Berg, military attaché at the Norwegian legation. Funding and other details were discussed by the Norwegian government-in-exile in London.

The Swedish Government was not officially informed of the plans for training Norwegian police troops until 2 November 1943, although Minister Möller had been involved in the preparations. On 3 December 1943 the Swedish Government officially allowed the training of 8,000 reserve troops and 1,500 ordinary police troops. The training should take place in separate camps, and the maximum number of troops in each camp was limited to 500, excluding administration and catering staff. Shooting practice was allowed in four camps, and weapons should be available for one third of the troops. The duration of the training was limited to three months. Harry Söderman was appointed as responsible for the training of Norwegian police troops.

Camps

The Swedish government allowed only four camps for weapons training. These were Mälsåker, Bäckehagen (outside Falun), Färnabruk and Älgberget. A number of other camps were established at various locations for the training  of reserve troops. The original list included the farm Toresta, Mauritzberg Castle, Öreryd and Mossebo, Stråtenbo Manor, Tofta, Tappudden, Skålmyra and Holmarudden. Training of ordinary police troops continued at Gottröra. A camp for Danish police troops was located in Sofielund.

 Battalion I. Övertorneå. Commanding Officer (CO): Odd Mølster
 Battalion II. Övertorneå
 Battalion III. Baggböle, Njurunda. CO: Captain Ola Tvedt
 Battalion IV. Öreryd. CO: Axel Baumann
 Battalion V. Övertorneå. CO: Major Oliver Smith
 Battalion VI. Bäckehagen, outside of Falun
 Battalion VII. Skålmyra and Tappudden, Furudal. CO: Niclas Baumann
 Battalion VIII. Skålmyra, Furudal
 Battalion IX. Tappudden, Furudal (not ready before the end of the war)
 Finnmark Battalion. Färna, Skinnskatteberg 
 Gunnery Range and Command School, later Artillery training. Mälsåker, Stallarholmen
 Coastal Artillery (Harbor Police) and radio signal personnel. Mauritzberg, Vikbolandet
 HS-Battalion, weapons training, training of medical personnel and Milorg-specialists. Älgberget, north of Björbo. 
 Medical personnel. Stråtenbo, NNE Borlänge
 Discipline and Mustering Camp. Tofta brunn, Sundborn
 Section I (Long-distance radio and telegraphy). Mossebo, outside Öreryd
 Commando training camp (Forward Travel). Ählby, Ekerö, CO: Lieutenant Kristen Aasen, SOE (Kompani Linge)
 Training of vehicle mechanics, drivers, motorcycle orderlies, and female personnel. Berga, Turinge
 Stableman and signalmen. Holmarudden, Erikslund, west of Ånge
 Rikspolitiet (National Constabulary) and general staff officers. Johannesberg, Gottröra
 Command, signal and weapon mechanic training. Runsten, Johannesberg, Gottröra
 Military K9-training. Stora Fors, Gottröra
 Flight Cadets. Skarpnäck, Stockholm
 Paratroopers and radio telegraphist. Norrbotten Wing, Kallax 
 Reception Center, Interrogation and Recruitment Office for the Police Troops and SOE. Kjesäters slott, Vingåker
 Camp Finse (2,000 soldiers for Finnmark). Karesuando
 Pioneers (Engineers). Voxna, Ovanåker
 Traffic Regulation and Patrol Cars. Åkeshov, outside of Stockholm

Liberation of Finnmark

From 12 January 1945 the troops participated in the operations in Finnmark. In total around 1,300 police troops were involved. This operation was decided by the British government.

End of World War II

In May 1945 the police troops - taking with them about one month of supplies - were transferred to Norway to help with keeping order and arresting collaborators following the German capitulation.

See also
Danish Brigade in Sweden

References

Footnotes

Bibliography

 The original title was Skandinaviskt mellanspel. Norska och danska trupper i Sverige

Sweden in World War II
Military units and formations of Norway in World War II
Norway–Sweden relations